This is a list of lighthouses in North Korea.

Lighthouses

See also
 Lists of lighthouses and lightvessels

References

External links

 

North Korea
Lists of buildings and structures in North Korea
 
Lighthouses